Nevada N. Stranahan (February 27, 1861 – July 6, 1928) was a Collector of the Port of New York who was born in Oswego County, New York.

Career
He studied law at Columbia Law School and was admitted to the bar. He was a member of the New York State Assembly (Oswego Co., 1st D.) in 1890, 1891 and 1892; and was District Attorney of Oswego County.

He was a member of the New York State Senate representing the 37th District from 1896 to 1902, sitting in the 119th, 120th, 121st, 122nd, 123rd, 124th and 125th New York State Legislatures. In March 1902, he was appointed by President Theodore Roosevelt as Collector of the Port of New York, and resigned his seat in the Senate. Illness forced him to resign the collectorship in 1907.

Death
Stranahan died in Winwick, Northamptonshire, England on July 6, 1928. His wife Elsie predeceased him in 1922. Afterward he lived in Winwick with his daughter Louise, the wife of Major Henry Torrens. He was survived by his daughter and a sister, Mrs. Cora Stranahan Woodward, of New York City.

References

Republican Party New York (state) state senators
People from Oswego County, New York
1861 births
1928 deaths
Collectors of the Port of New York
Republican Party members of the New York State Assembly
People from West Northamptonshire District
Oswego County District Attorneys